Chaetopodella is a subgenus of flies belonging to the family Sphaeroceridae, the lesser dung flies.

Species
C. aethiopica Papp, 2008
C. cursoni (Richards, 1939)
C. demeteri Papp, 2008
C. denigrata (Duda, 1925)
C. impermissa (Richards, 1980)
C. latitarsis Hayashi & Papp, 2007
C. lesnei (Séguy, 1933)
C. nigeriae Papp, 2008
C. nigrinotum Hayashi & Papp, 2007
C. orientalis Hayashi & Papp, 2007
C. ornata Hayashi & Papp, 2007
C. scutellaris (Haliday, 1836)

References

 

Sphaeroceridae
Diptera of Asia
Diptera of Africa
Diptera of Europe
Insect subgenera